Musa Muhammed Shehu (born 31 October 1996) is a Nigerian professional footballer who plays for Bosnian Premier League club Sarajevo as a defender.

Club career
Born in Kano, Muhammed has played club football for İstanbul Başakşehir.

On 3 February 2017, Muhammed signed for Željezničar.

On 7 September 2017, Muhammed was loaned to Bulgarian First League club Lokomotiv Plovdiv.

On 28 June 2022, Muhammed signed for Sarajevo.

International career
He made his international debut for Nigeria in 2016, against Mali in an international friendly. and he was selected by Nigeria for their 35-man provisional squad for the 2016 Summer Olympics.

References

1996 births
Living people
Sportspeople from Kano
Nigerian footballers
Nigerian Muslims
Nigeria youth international footballers
Nigeria international footballers
Association football defenders
Süper Lig players
Premier League of Bosnia and Herzegovina players
First Professional Football League (Bulgaria) players
Croatian Football League players
İstanbul Başakşehir F.K. players
FK Željezničar Sarajevo players
PFC Lokomotiv Plovdiv players
HNK Gorica players
FK Sarajevo players
Nigerian expatriate footballers
Nigerian expatriate sportspeople in Turkey
Nigerian expatriate sportspeople in Bulgaria
Nigerian expatriate sportspeople in Croatia
Expatriate footballers in Turkey
Expatriate footballers in Bosnia and Herzegovina
Expatriate footballers in Bulgaria
Expatriate footballers in Croatia